The 2013 All-Big Ten Conference football team consists of American football players chosen as All-Big Ten Conference players for the 2013 Big Ten Conference football season.  The conference recognizes two official All-Big Ten selectors: (1) the Big Ten conference coaches selected separate offensive and defensive units and named first- and second-team players (the "Coaches" team); and (2) a panel of sports writers and broadcasters covering the Big Ten also selected offensive and defensive units and named first- and second-team players (the "Media" team).  Only one Big Ten player, Darqueze Dennard of Michigan State, was also selected as a consensus first-team player on the 2013 College Football All-America Team

Offensive selections

Quarterbacks
 Braxton Miller, Ohio State (Coaches-1; Media-1)
 Connor Cook, Michigan State (Coaches-2) 
 Nathan Scheelhaase, Illinois (Media-2)

Running backs
 Ameer Abdullah, Nebraska (Coaches-1; Media-1)
 Carlos Hyde, Ohio State (Coaches-1; Media-1)
 Melvin Gordon, Wisconsin (Coaches-2; Media-2) 
 James White, Wisconsin (Coaches-2; Media-2)

Receivers
 Jared Abbrederis, Wisconsin (Coaches-1; Media-1)
 Allen Robinson, Penn State  (Coaches-1; Media-1)
 Jeremy Gallon, Michigan (Coaches-2; Media-2) 
 Corey Brown, Ohio State (Coaches-2) 
 Cody Latimer, Indiana (Media-2)

Centers
 Corey Linsley, Ohio State  (Coaches-1; Media-1)
 Cole Pensick, Nebraska (Coaches-2) 
 Jack Allen, Michigan State (Media-2)

Guards
 John Urschel, Penn State  (Coaches-1; Media-1)
 Ryan Groy, Wisconsin  (Coaches-1; Media-2)
 Andrew Norwell, Ohio State (Coaches-2; Media-1) 
 Blake Treadwell, Michigan State (Coaches-2; Media-2)

Tackles
 Taylor Lewan, Michigan (Coaches-1; Media-1)
 Brandon Scherff, Iowa  (Coaches-1; Media-2)
 Jack Mewhort, Ohio State (Coaches-2; Media-1) 
 Brett Van Sloten, Iowa (Coaches-2)
 Rob Havenstein, Wisconsin (Media-2)

Tight ends
C. J. Fiedorowicz, Iowa (Coaches-1; Media-2)
Devin Funchess, Michigan (Coaches-2; Media-1)

Defensive selections

Defensive linemen
 Shilique Calhoun, Michigan State (Coaches-1; Media-1)
 Ra'Shede Hageman, Minnesota (Coaches-1; Media-1)
 Randy Gregory, Nebraska (Coaches-1; Media-1)
 DaQuan Jones, Penn State (Coaches-1; Media-2)
 Noah Spence, Ohio State (Coaches-2; Media-1)
 Michael Bennett, Ohio State  (Coaches-2; Media-2)
 Carl Davis, Iowa  (Coaches-2)
 Frank Clark, Michigan  (Coaches-2)
 Theiren Cockran, Minnesota (Media-2)
 Tyler Scott, Northwestern (Media-2)

Linebackers
 Max Bullough, Michigan State (Coaches-1; Media-1)
 Ryan Shazier, Ohio State (Coaches-1; Media-1)
 Chris Borland, Wisconsin (Coaches-1; Media-1)
 James Morris, Iowa  (Coaches-2; Media-2)
 Denicos Allen, Michigan State  (Coaches-2; Media-2)
 Anthony Hitchens, Iowa  (Coaches-2)
 Jonathan Brown, Illinois (Media-2)

Defensive backs
 Darqueze Dennard, Michigan State (Coaches-1; Media-1)
 Kurtis Drummond, Michigan State (Coaches-1; Media-2)
 Blake Countess, Michigan (Coaches-2; Media-1)
 Bradley Roby, Ohio State (Coaches-2; Media-1)
 Isaiah Lewis, Michigan State  (Coaches-1)
 B. J. Lowery, Iowa (Media-1)
 Stanley Jean-Baptiste, Nebraska (Coaches-2; Media-2)
 Ciante Evans, Nebraska (Coaches-2; Media-2)
 Brock Vereen, Minnesota (Coaches-2)
 Ricardo Allen, Purdue (Media-2)

Special teams

Kickers
 Jeff Budzien, Northwestern (Coaches-1; Media-1)
 Mitch Ewald, Indiana (Coaches-2)
 Mike Meyer, Iowa

Punter
 Cody Webster, Purdue (Coaches-1 [tie]; Media-1)
 Mike Sadler, Michigan State (Coaches-1 [tie]; Media-2)

Key
Bold = Consensus first-team selection by both the coaches and media

Coaches = Selected by the Big Ten Conference coaches

Media = Selected by the conference media

See also
 2013 College Football All-America Team

References

All-Big Ten Conference
All-Big Ten Conference football teams